The Miami Line is an urban-scale multicolored neon-light installation, designed by Rockne Krebs, in the U.S. city of Miami, Florida, stretching  along the Metrorail bridge over the Miami River.

Since its creation, The Miami Line has become a signature element of the downtown Miami skyline and has been featured in countless photographs. Krebs stated that "the Miami Line was conceived as a means to generate visual drama and create an identifying element which is unique to Miami by simply enhancing what is already present". The Miami Line will be restored in phases starting in fall/winter 2014. Miami-Dade County Art in Public Places, a program of the Miami-Dade County Department of Cultural Affairs has developed a plan to recreate the work in LED lighting, which will replicate the visual effect of neon and will make the work resistant to train vibrations.

References

Sculptures in Florida
1984 establishments in Florida
Metrorail (Miami-Dade County)
Tourist attractions in Miami